The 2007 Nigerian Senate election in Kano State was held on 21 April 2007, to elect members of the Nigerian Senate to represent Kano State. Aminu Sule Garo representing Kano North, Kabiru Ibrahim Gaya representing Kano South and Mohammed Adamu Bello representing Kano Central all won on the platform of the All Nigeria Peoples Party.

Overview

Summary

Results

Kano North 
The election was won by Aminu Sule Garo of the All Nigeria Peoples Party.

Kano South 
The election was won by Kabiru Ibrahim Gaya of the All Nigeria Peoples Party.

Kano Central 
The election was won by Mohammed Adamu Bello of the All Nigeria Peoples Party.

References 

April 2007 events in Nigeria
Kano State Senate elections
Kan